Bimbashi Arabic ("soldier Arabic", or Mongallese) was a pidgin of Arabic which developed among military troops in Anglo-Egyptian Sudan, and was popular from 1870 to 1920. Bimbashi later branched and developed into three languages: Turku in Chad, Ki-Nubi in Kenya and Uganda, and Juba Arabic in South Sudan.

See also
Varieties of Arabic
Nubi language

Further reading

References

Arabic-based pidgins and creoles
Arabs in Egypt
Arabs in Sudan
Languages of Sudan
Military pidgins
Languages attested from the 1870s
Languages extinct in the 1920s